Glenn Ross (born 27 May 1971) known by his nickname "The Daddy", is a Northern Ireland former International Strongman and Powerlifter who has represented Northern Ireland and the UK in several World's Strongest Man competitions and various World Grand Prix and European Team competitions. Ross is the founder of the UK Strength Council and Scotland Strength Association and creator of the UK's Strongest Man competition as well as several regional and national qualifying events.

Strongman career
Ross is a 5-time winner of UK's Strongest Man - 2004, 2006, 2007, 2008 and 2010.

Ross is also a 3-time winner of Britain's Strongest Man - 1999, 2000, 2001.

In 2003, Ross lifted three cars with the rear wheels completely off the ground, the combined weight including the frames of the three Citroën Saxos was almost 3 tonnes.
But in the hands of the lifter, this weight is actually more like 400 kg. The lifter is not lifting the raw weight of the car, it is a lever system. 
He has competed in the World's Strongest Man competition on five occasions.

Arnold Strongman Classic

In 2005, Ross was in his peak physical condition. He was invited to Columbus, Ohio to compete in the Arnold Strongman Classic, the heaviest strongman competition in the world. In the first event, he shocked audience members and judges by strict-pressing the 366 lb. Apollon's Axle three times. He took first place in the Hummer tire deadlift, setting a world record of 977.5 pounds. In the Inch Dumbbell press, Ross tied for first alongside Hugo Girard and Brian Siders by strict-pressing the 173 pound dumbbell 10 times. Ross placed third behind Vasyl Virastyuk and champion Žydrūnas Savickas.

Ross competed in the 2006 Arnold Strongman Classic, but injuries to his patellar tendons severely affected his performance. Ross lost his world record in the Hummer tire deadlift to Žydrūnas Savickas. Placing 10th, it was Ross's last year in the competition.

Personal records

Powerlifting records
Squat - 400 kg (881 lb) raw;
Bench press - 295 kg (650 lb) raw;
Deadlift - 400 kg (881 lb) raw;
 Total - 1000 kg (2,200 lb) (380-240-380) (done at the Irish Senior Powerlifting Championship 2004).

Strongman records
Military press (standing) - 195 kg (429 lb);
Giant Log - 115 kg (254 lb) - 19 reps;
Steel Log - 300 mm diameter - 175 kg (385 lb) max - 12 reps;
Apollon's Axle - 166 kg (366 lb) - 3 reps with no leg drive;
Deadlifted 3 Citroën Saxos at once from the back below the knees - combined weight 2750 kg (6,050 lb);
Held a 1200 kg Citroën Berlingo Van for 176 seconds;
Held a 1400 kg BMW car - 74.8 seconds;
Held up 2 Citroën Saxos from the back combined weight 1700 kg for 67 seconds;
Deadlift - 430 kg (946 lb) (2006 UK's Strongest Man);
Hummer Tire Deadlift - 443.4 kg (977.50 lb) without a belt;

 Inch Dumbbell Press - 78 kg (172 lb) - 12 reps;

 Brick Lift - 25 bricks.

In car-lifting events of the sort mentioned above, the full mass of the vehicle is not lifted. Instead a system of levers is used to raise one set of wheels off the ground. The load at the competitor's hands is therefore of the order of 4000 Newtons (i.e. would feel like lifting a 400 kg (881 lb) barbell). The exact load depends not only on the vehicle mass, but the distribution of that mass, which axle (front/rear) is lifted and also the geometry (i.e. lengths etc.) of the lever arrangements. This means that performances from one competition to another cannot be reliably compared.

Ross's usual catchphrase during strongman competitions is "Who's the Daddy?".

Size
He has in the past weighed a staggering 474 lbs (215 kg) making him one of the heaviest strongmen in the world. He has lost 6 stone over 2009/2010 and is now 184 kg in weight. Ross has however since increased his weight to over 500 lbs (35 stone) and is now 213 kg in weight.

Personal
Ross has appeared on several TV shows, including Kelly Show, They Think It's All Over, The John Daley Show, Harry Hill's TV Burp, 8 Out of 10 Cats Does Countdown, Celebrity Big Brother's Big Mouth, Ask Rhod Gilbert and Hole in the Wall. Ross works as a bouncer in County Down when he is not training. Ross is married with two children.

References

1971 births
Living people
Strength athletes from Northern Ireland
British strength athletes
People from Banbridge